Tigran Kotanjian (born September 1, 1981) is an Armenian chess grandmaster. He was Armenian Chess Champion in 2014.

Career
Kotanjian won the Dubai Chess Open in 2009 and Karen Asrian Memorial in 2010. In 2011, he tied for 2nd–3rd with Kirill Stupak in the 4th Beirut Open tournament. In the same year he won the 4th Karen Asrian Memorial in Jermuk. He won the  74th Armenian Chess Championship in 2014.

He received his International Master title in 2003 and Grandmaster title in 2006. , he is the No. 22 ranked Armenian player.

References

External links
Grandmaster Games Database - Tigran Kotanjian

1981 births
Living people
Chess grandmasters
Armenian chess players